Waitākere Ward is a district of Auckland Council in New Zealand. It consists of the part of the old Waitakere City lying west of a line from Te Atatū Peninsula to Titirangi.

The ward elects two councillors, currently Shane Henderson and Ken Turner, who have oversight of its two local boards, Henderson-Massey and Waitākere Ranges.

Demographics

Waitākere ward had a population of 170,514 at the 2018 New Zealand census, an increase of 14,433 people (9.2%) since the 2013 census, and an increase of 26,226 people (18.2%) since the 2006 census. There were 52,704 households, comprising 84,312 males and 86,205 females, giving a sex ratio of 0.98 males per female. The median age was 34.1 years (compared with 37.4 years nationally), with 38,010 people (22.3%) aged under 15 years, 36,177 (21.2%) aged 15 to 29, 78,606 (46.1%) aged 30 to 64, and 17,724 (10.4%) aged 65 or older.

Ethnicities were 56.6% European/Pākehā, 15.8% Māori, 18.1% Pacific peoples, 23.3% Asian, and 3.6% other ethnicities. People may identify with more than one ethnicity.

The percentage of people born overseas was 35.2, compared with 27.1% nationally.

Although some people chose not to answer the census's question about religious affiliation, 44.9% had no religion, 37.6% were Christian, 1.0% had Māori religious beliefs, 4.3% were Hindu, 2.4% were Muslim, 1.6% were Buddhist and 2.2% had other religions.

Of those at least 15 years old, 31,212 (23.6%) people had a bachelor's or higher degree, and 21,096 (15.9%) people had no formal qualifications. The median income was $33,600, compared with $31,800 nationally. 22,464 people (17.0%) earned over $70,000 compared to 17.2% nationally. The employment status of those at least 15 was that 70,071 (52.9%) people were employed full-time, 17,391 (13.1%) were part-time, and 6,114 (4.6%) were unemployed.

Councillors

Election Results 
Election Results for the Waitākere Ward:

2022 Election Results

References

External links
 Waitākere ward, Auckland Council

Wards of the Auckland Region
West Auckland, New Zealand